Andrew P. McEwan was a Scottish amateur football forward who played in the Scottish League for Queen's Park, Queen of the South and Rangers. He was capped by Scotland at amateur level.

References 

Scottish footballers
Scottish Football League players
Queen's Park F.C. players
Association football forwards
Scotland amateur international footballers
Year of birth missing
Place of birth missing
Rangers F.C. players
Queen of the South F.C. players